Samer Tawk (born 3 September 1998) is a Lebanese cross-country skier. He competed in the men's 15 kilometre freestyle at the 2018 Winter Olympics.

References

External links
 

1998 births
Living people
Lebanese male cross-country skiers
Olympic cross-country skiers of Lebanon
Cross-country skiers at the 2018 Winter Olympics
Place of birth missing (living people)
Cross-country skiers at the 2017 Asian Winter Games